The Good Doctor is an American medical drama television series based on the 2013 South Korean series of the same name. Actor Daniel Dae Kim noticed the original series and bought the rights for his production company. He began adapting the series and, in 2015, eventually shopped it to CBS Television Studios. CBS decided against creating a pilot, but because Kim felt so strongly about the series, he bought back the rights from CBS. Eventually, Sony Pictures Television and Kim worked out a deal and brought on David Shore, creator of the Fox medical drama House, to develop the series.

The show is produced by Sony Pictures Television Studios and ABC Signature, in association with production companies Shore Z Productions, 3AD, and Entermedia. David Shore serves as showrunner and Daniel Dae Kim is an executive producer for the show.

The series stars Freddie Highmore as Shaun Murphy, a young autistic savant surgical resident at the fictional San Jose St. Bonaventure Hospital. Hill Harper, Christina Chang, Richard Schiff, Will Yun Lee, Fiona Gubelmann, Paige Spara, Noah Galvin, Bria Samoné Henderson and Brandon Larracuente also star in the show. Nicholas Gonzalez, Antonia Thomas, Chuku Modu, Beau Garrett, Tamlyn Tomita, Jasika Nicole, and Osvaldo Benavides used to also star or had recurring roles in the show, but their characters were written off. The series received a put pilot commitment at ABC after a previous attempted series did not move forward at CBS Television Studios in 2015; The Good Doctor was ordered to series in May 2017. On October 3, 2017, ABC picked up the series for a full season of 18 episodes. The series is primarily filmed in Vancouver, British Columbia.

The series debuted on September 25, 2017. The Good Doctor has received generally mixed reviews from critics, who have praised Highmore's performance but criticized the series' storylines. In March 2022, the series was renewed for a sixth season, which premiered on October 3, 2022.

Premise
The series follows Shaun Murphy, a young autistic surgeon with savant syndrome from the small city of Casper, Wyoming, where he had a troubled past. He relocates to San Jose, California, to work at the prestigious San Jose St. Bonaventure Hospital.

Cast and characters

Main
 Freddie Highmore as Dr. Shaun Murphy, an autistic surgical resident. His savant abilities include near-photographic recall and the ability to note minute details and changes. His hiring created a divided opinion among the board. At the end of season 5, he marries Lea Dilallo. In season 6, he becomes a surgical attending after having completed his residency. He is portrayed in flashbacks to his teen years by Graham Verchere.
 Nicholas Gonzalez as Dr. Neil Melendez (seasons 1–3; special guest season 4), an attending cardiothoracic surgeon in charge of the surgical residents. He died at the end of season 3 and came back as visions to Dr. Claire Brown in season 4.
 Antonia Thomas as Dr. Claire Browne (seasons 1–4; guest season 5), a surgical resident who forms a close friendship with Shaun. Claire is known for her empathy and emotional maturity, and is usually very patient and understanding when communicating with Shaun. At the end of season 4, she decides to remain in Guatemala in order to continue helping the less fortunate obtain necessary medical care. In season 5, she returns to celebrate Shaun's wedding and to seek her friends' help with treating one of her patients. Claire also reveals that she has been offered the position of Chief of Surgery at the Guatemala hospital.
 Chuku Modu as Dr. Jared Kalu (seasons 1–2; recurring season 6), a surgical resident from a wealthy family. He moves to Denver at the start of season 2 after conflicting with Dr. Andrews, who fired him for assaulting an employee who tried to take advantage of Claire, leading Jared to get his job back by suing the hospital for racism, at the cost of losing Andrews and Melendez's respect of him. In season six, Jared returns as a concierge doctor seeking Shaun's help with his client. With Shaun's encouragement, Jared returns to St. Bonaventure as a first-year resident on Shaun's team.
 Beau Garrett as Jessica Preston (season 1; guest season 4), the hospital in-house attorney and Vice President of Risk Management. She is the granddaughter of the hospital founder, a friend of Glassman, and Melendez's ex-fiancée.
 Irene Keng as Dr. Elle McLean (season 1), a surgical resident.
 Hill Harper as Dr. Marcus Andrews, an attending surgeon specializing in plastic surgery. In season one he is the Chief of Surgery who is eyeing Dr. Glassman's job as hospital president. In season 2, he becomes president after Glassman resigns. After being fired as hospital president for firing Dr. Jackson Han, the new chief, he accepts an offer to return as attending surgeon from Dr. Lim. In the season 3 premiere, he grows into this role as Dr. Murphy reminds him what an important "Good Samaritan" he is. His niece Dr. Olivia Jackson is one of the surgical residents in season 4. In season 5, he replaces Dr. Lim as Chief of Surgery and he is reinstated as hospital president after the Ethicure acquisition is called off. It is also revealed in the same season that he is dyslexic.
 Richard Schiff as Dr. Aaron Glassman, President of the San Jose St. Bonaventure Hospital and former attending neurosurgeon, who has been a mentor and good friend of Shaun since he was 14.
 Tamlyn Tomita as Allegra Aoki (seasons 1–2; guest, season 3), Chairwoman of the San Jose St. Bonaventure Hospital Board and Vice President of the foundation that controls the hospital's funding.
 Will Yun Lee as Dr. Alex Park (season 2–present; recurring, season 1), a surgical resident and a former police officer from Phoenix, Arizona who decided to become a doctor. In season 4, he starts a relationship with Morgan before breaking up with her in season 6 after she turns down at the last minute a job offer at New York. He also becomes a surgical attending along with Shaun.
 Fiona Gubelmann as Dr. Morgan Reznick (season 2–present; recurring, season 1), a competitive surgical resident who has a subtle rivalry with Claire as they have opposite personalities and work ethics. In season 4, she switches from surgery to internal medicine due to the damage she inflicted on her hands at the end of season 3.
 Christina Chang as Dr. Audrey Lim (season 2–present; recurring, season 1), an attending trauma surgeon in charge of the ER and surgical residents and later the Chief of Surgery. In season 4, she develops post-traumatic stress disorder from her experiences with treating the COVID-19 pandemic. In the season 5 finale, Lim is stabbed and severely wounded and, although Andrews, Glassman, Shaun, Jordan, Jerome and Lea manage to save her life, Lim is left paralyzed from the waist down, likely as a result of Shaun's risky surgery to save her liver. After another surgery, Lim regains the ability to walk, albeit with the aid of a cane.
 Paige Spara as Lea Dilallo-Murphy (season 2–present; recurring, season 1), Shaun's love interest until she left to pursue her dream. Later after she returned, they decide to be platonic close friends and roommates, but they finally became a couple in the season 3 finale. In season 4, she and Shaun were expecting a baby girl together before she has a miscarriage due to a medical problem. In the season 4 finale, Lea gets engaged to Shaun. In the season 5 finale, they get married. In season 6, she and Shaun are expecting a baby boy. Lea worked as an automotive engineer in the first two seasons before becoming Glassman's assistant in season 3. In season 4, she has become the head of the hospital's IT department.
 Jasika Nicole as Dr. Carly Lever (season 3; recurring seasons 1–2), the hospital's head pathologist introduced in season 1 who becomes Shaun's co-worker in season 2 and girlfriend in season 3. However, Carly breaks up with Shaun near the end of season 3 after realizing that he's in love with Lea.
 Bria Samoné Henderson as Dr. Jordan Allen (season 5–present; recurring, season 4), one of the new surgical residents who is also a successful inventor. She is initially one of Shaun's junior residents along with Olivia but is later assigned to Claire along with Enrique.
 Noah Galvin as Dr. Asher Wolke (season 5–present; recurring, season 4), one of the new surgical residents. He is a former Hasidic Jew and the son of a rabbi who became an atheist after leaving his Hasidic community at eighteen and is also openly gay. He is a graduate of New York University majoring in neurology. In season 6, after Shaun becomes an attending, Asher serves as one of his residents and he is dating nurse Jerome Martel.
 Osvaldo Benavides as Dr. Mateo Rendón Osma (season 5; guest season 4), a Mexican-American surgeon whom the team meets in Guatemala and who decides to return to the United States afterwards. He begins forming a romantic relationship with Lim during their time together in Guatemala.
 Brandon Larracuente as Dr. Daniel "Danny" Perez (season 6) one of the new residents in season 6, who has an interest in Dr. Allen. However, he is revealed to be a former drug addict and thus cannot bring himself to pursue a relationship with her or anyone, fearing that this would get in the way of prioritizing his sobriety.

Recurring

 Dylan Kingwell as Steve Murphy (season 1, 3 and 6): Shaun's late younger brother, in flashbacks  and later dreams and visions. He also portrays Evan Gallico, a boy in the present that resembles Shaun's brother and is suffering from stage 4 osteosarcoma.
 Elfina Luk as Nurse Dalisay Villanueva. In season 5, she is revealed to be domestically abused by her partner Owen, which makes her fail to catch up to her shifts. At the end of season 5, she is stabbed by Owen, but Andrews and Glassman manage to save her life. Owen is arrested for her attempted murder, but he expresses remorse for his actions to Asher Wolke, almost committing suicide by cop out of guilt. She is shown to have fully recovered and returned to work by the time of Lim's return three months later.
 Teryl Rothery as J.L.: One of the nurses who is often seen helping out in surgery. In "Claire," her full name is given as Jan Lancaster.
 Chris D'Elia as Kenny (season 1): Shaun's new neighbor, who moves into Lea's apartment. Shaun mentioned that he was arrested when Lea returned.
 Sheila Kelley as hospital barista Debbie Wexler (seasons 1–4), a love interest for Dr. Glassman and later his fiancée and wife. After getting fired in the third season, she becomes Glassman's office manager. In season 4, they separate after a series of arguments. In real life, Kelley is married to Richard Schiff, who plays Glassman.
 Lisa Edelstein as Dr. Marina Blaize (season 2), an oncologist
 Daniel Dae Kim as Dr. Jackson Han (season 2), former Chief of Surgery of San Jose St. Bonaventure Hospital, who had trouble with Shaun's behavior and autism. Against Shaun's wishes, he has him transferred to Pathology where he can help patients without interacting with them, but Han fires him when he keeps on demanding his old job as a surgeon back. Andrews, as president of the hospital, eventually fires Han to save Shaun, but gets himself fired as well.
 Sharon Leal as Breeze Browne (season 3; guest season 1–2), Dr. Claire Browne's mother who suffers from bipolar disorder. She dies in a car crash in the season 3 episode "Claire."
 Ricky He as Kellan Park (season 2–4), Dr. Park's estranged son
 Karin Konoval as Deena Petringa (season 2–4), a nurse at St. Bonaventure who is often seen assisting in surgeries or monitoring patients. She dies of COVID-19 in "Frontline Part Two" in season four. She has been a nurse for forty years and has a son and granddaughter.
 Brian Marc as Dr. Enrique "Ricky" Guerin (season 4): One of the new surgical residents who has a laid-back attitude and is polyamorous. He is assigned as one of Claire's junior residents. Enrique eventually decides to leave St. Bonaventure in order to join a program that will allow him to help out in needy areas of the world.
 Summer Brown as Dr. Olivia Jackson (season 4): One of the new surgical residents coming from Chicago initially who is double majoring in neonatal and pediatric oncology. Her parents are also both surgeons. Olivia has both an MD and PhD from Harvard. She is also secretly the niece of Dr. Marcus Andrews. She is one of Shaun's junior residents before getting herself fired after falsely taking credit for leaking patient information, having never actually wanted to be a doctor in the first place.
 Marcuis Harris as Miles Brown (season 4), Claire's absentee father shows up out of nowhere in episode 13 of season 4: "Spilled Milk."  In episode 18: "Forgive or Forget", they start to patch things up and form a relationship.
Rachel Bay Jones as Salen Morrison (season 5), who buys St. Bonaventure at the start of season 5 through her corporative Ethicure company. She is described by executive producer David Shore as an "internal nemesis". In "Cheat Day", after firing nearly all of his colleagues for going against her, Andrews manages to convince her to stand down and she signs off the Ethicure ownership.
 Hollis Jane Andrews as Sophie (season 5), a documentalist with a form of dwarfism who takes an interest in Shaun and Lea
 Giacomo Baessato as Jerome Martel (season 5-present), a male nurse who begins dating Asher. 
 Savannah Welch as Dr. Danica "Danni" Powell (season 6), one of the new residents in season 6. She is a former US Navy Lieutenant who lost her right leg following a flight deck accident. In "The Good Boy," especially due to her constant pattern of disobedience, she is fired after an unauthorized surgery to save her friend on parole Vince, which she had dragged Asher into, who gets a two-month probation, along with Perez for his relapse.

Episodes

Production

Development
In May 2014, CBS Television Studios began development on an American remake of the hit South Korean medical drama Good Doctor with Daniel Dae Kim as producer. Kim explained the appeal of adapting the series as "something that can fit into a recognizable world, with a breadth of characters that can be explored in the long run". The story of an autistic pediatric surgeon was to be set in Boston and projected to air in August 2015. However, CBS did not pick up the project and it moved to Sony Pictures Television, with a put pilot commitment from ABC in October 2016. The series was developed by David Shore, who is credited as executive producer alongside Kim, Sebastian Lee, and David Kim. ABC officially ordered the series to pilot in January 2017.

On May 11, 2017, ABC ordered to series as a co-production with Sony Pictures Television and ABC Studios, and it was officially picked up for a season of 18 episodes on October 3, 2017. On March 7, 2018, ABC renewed the series for a second season. On February 5, 2019, during the TCA press tour, ABC renewed the series for a third season which premiered on September 23, 2019. On February 10, 2020, ABC renewed the series for a fourth season which premiered on November 2, 2020. On August 6, 2020, it was reported that the fourth season opener is set to focus on the COVID-19 pandemic. On May 3, 2021, ABC renewed the series for a fifth season which premiered on September 27, 2021. On March 30, 2022, ABC renewed the series for a sixth season which premiered on October 3, 2022.

Casting
On February 17, 2017, Antonia Thomas was cast as Dr. Claire Browne, a strong-willed and talented doctor who forms a special connection with Shaun. A week later, Freddie Highmore was cast in the lead role as Dr. Shaun Murphy, an autistic surgeon, and Nicholas Gonzalez was cast as Dr. Neil Melendez, the supervisor of the hospital's surgical residents. The next month, Chuku Modu was cast as resident Dr. Jared Kalu (originally Dr. Jared Unger); Hill Harper as head of surgery Dr. Marcus Andrews (originally Dr. Horace Andrews); Irene Keng as resident Dr. Elle McLean; and Richard Schiff was cast as Dr. Aaron Glassman (originally Dr. Ira Glassman), the hospital president and Shaun's mentor. Schiff was shortly followed by Beau Garrett as hospital board member Jessica Preston and a friend of Dr. Glassman. In September 2017, Tamlyn Tomita was promoted to the principal cast as Allegra Aoki.

In April 2018, it was revealed that Will Yun Lee, Fiona Gubelmann, Christina Chang, and Paige Spara had been promoted to series regulars for the second season, after recurring in the first as Alex, Morgan, Audrey, and Lea, respectively.  In addition, it was announced that Chuku Modu would not return for the second season. On September 19, 2018, it was announced that Beau Garrett had left the series ahead of the second-season premiere.

In January 2019, it was announced that executive producer Daniel Dae Kim had been added in a recurring role during the second season. In July 2019, it was announced that Jasika Nicole was promoted to series regular for the third season. In October 2020, Noah Galvin, Summer Brown, Bria Samoné Henderson, and Brian Marc were cast in recurring roles for the fourth season. In May 2021, Galvin and Henderson were promoted to series regulars for the fifth season. In June 2021, Osvaldo Benavides was promoted to series regular for the fifth season.
In April 2022, Hollis Jane Andrews was booked in a recurring role for the fifth season while Brandon Larracuente and Savannah Welch were cast in recurring roles for the sixth season. On November 8, 2022, Larracuente had been promoted to a series regular for the sixth season. On February 22, 2023, it was announced that Modu is set to reprise his role as Dr. Jared Kalu in recurring capacity for the sixth season.

Filming
Production on the pilot took place from March 21 to April 6, 2017, in Vancouver, British Columbia. Filming for the rest of the season began on July 26, 2017, and concluded on March 1, 2018. Filming for season two began on June 27, 2018, and concluded on February 12, 2019. Filming for the third season began on June 19, 2019, and concluded on March 3, 2020. Filming for the fourth season was originally scheduled to begin on August 4, 2020, and conclude on April 13, 2021, but was later postponed to September 2, 2020, and concluded on May 14, 2021. The fifth season began production on August 16, 2021, and concluded on April 29, 2022. Filming for the sixth season began on August 3, 2022, and is scheduled to conclude on April 17, 2023.

Music
Emmy-nominated Dan Romer serves as the primary composer for the series. He won an ASCAP Screen Music Award for his work on the show.

Release

Broadcast
The Good Doctor began airing on September 25, 2017, on ABC in the United States, and on CTV in Canada. Sky Witness acquired the broadcast rights for the United Kingdom and Ireland. Seven Network airs the series in Australia. Colors Infinity acquired the rights to the series for the Indian Subcontinent in October 2017, airing each episode 24 hours after its US broadcast. Wowow, the largest Japanese private satellite and pay-per-view television network in Japan acquired the rights to broadcast the series beginning in April 2018. In the Netherlands, the series began airing on January 29, 2018, on RTL 4 and on video-on-demand service Videoland. In Italy, the series premiered on Rai 1 on July 17, 2018, setting a record of 5.2 million total viewers from 9:30 pm to 11:45 pm, reaching a share of 31,7% in the third episode and entering the Top 10 of Most Watched Foreign TV Series in Italy at No.5, an event since the leaderboard never changed again after the last entry on November 14, 2007, with an episode of House. In Brazil, the series was the first international production to be released at the TV Globo's  video-on-demand service Globoplay. On August 27, the two first episodes was aired at Globo free-to-air television network to announce the launch of the series in the streaming service. On March 20, 2020, the Chilean public broadcaster Televisión Nacional de Chile announced the arrival of the series, with a "Coming soon" advertisement. In Bulgaria, the series began airing on July 13, 2020, on bTV.

Marketing
A full-length trailer was released for ABC's May 2017 Upfront presentation, which /Film's Ethan Anderton described the concept as feeling like "House meets Rain Man, that just might be enough to make it interesting". However, he questioned "how long can audiences be entranced by both the brilliance of [Highmore's] character's savant skills and the difficulties that come from his autism in the workplace." Daniel Fienberg of The Hollywood Reporter felt the trailer was "both kinda progressive and really dated". He added, "Too much felt on-the-nose—especially Hill Harper as the main character's detractor and Richard Schiff as his noble defender", while also commentating that "On-the-nose/premise is how you have to trailer a show like this, and maybe spaced out over 43 minutes it won't grate." Ben Travers and Steve Greene for IndieWire called it "a serious trailer for a serious subject. The first glimpse of Highmore's character hints that they're toeing the line between presenting a thoughtful depiction of his condition and using his perceptive abilities as a kind of secret weapon." The trailer had been viewed over 25.4 million times after a week of its release, including over 22 million views on Facebook.

The pilot was screened at ABC's PaleyFest event on September 9, 2017. On March 22, 2018, members of the cast as well as executive producers Shore and Kim attended the 35th annual PaleyFest LA to promote the series, along with a screening of the season finale of the first season.

Streaming
In May 2018, Hulu acquired the SVOD rights to new and past episodes of the series to air exclusively on Hulu, with future episodes becoming available the day after their original broadcast on ABC. In Australia the show's first 5 seasons streams on Netflix, Amazon Prime Video and Stan as well as Disney+ through its Star hub as the show is produced by ABC Signature and Sony Pictures Television and is part of the Disney/Sony Deal that was struck in 2021. 6 Seasons also stream for free with ads on 7 Plus. In New Zealand, the show is available exclusively for streaming on Neon. The pilot episode was made available for viewing on February 5, 2018, with the newer episodes coming express from the US. In Canada, the series streams on Crave. In India, the series streams exclusively on Sony LIV at the same time as U.S. Broadcast and show's first four seasons are also available to stream on Amazon Prime Video and Netflix.

Home media
Region 1
 Season One: August 7, 2018
 Season Two: August 6, 2019
 Season Three: August 4, 2020
 Season Four: August 31, 2021
 Season Five: August 30, 2022

Region 2 (UK)
 Complete Season One: October 8, 2018

Region 4 (Australia)
 Season One: August 15, 2018
 Season Two: July 10, 2019
 Season One–Season Two: July 10, 2019
 Season Three: July 15, 2020
 Season Four: August 25, 2021

Reception

Ratings

The series premiere earned a 2.2/9 rating in the 18- to 49-year-old demographic, with 11.22 million total viewers, making it the most watched Monday drama debut on ABC in 21 years, since Dangerous Minds in September 1996, and the highest rated Monday drama in the 18–49 demographic in 8.5 years, since Castle in March 2009. Factoring live plus seven-day ratings, the pilot was watched by a total of 19.2 million viewers and set a record for DVR viewers with 7.9 million, surpassing the record of 7.67 million set by the pilot of Designated Survivor in 2016. According to TV Guide November 13–26 issue, the October 9 episode attracted 18.2 million viewers, beating out both high-rated CBS shows NCIS and The Big Bang Theory for the most viewed primetime show that week.

Critical response
On Rotten Tomatoes, the first season has an approval rating of 63% based on 43 reviews, with an average rating of 5.60/10. The website's consensus reads, "The Good Doctors heavy-handed bedside manner undermines a solid lead performance, but under all the emotionally manipulative gimmickry, there's still plenty of room to improve." On Metacritic, it has a weighted average score of 53 out of 100 based on 15 critics, indicating "mixed or average reviews".

Giving his first impression of the series' pilot for TVLine, Matt Webb Mitovich stated, "The Good Doctor boasts great DNA... [and] has the potential to be a refreshingly thought-provoking hospital drama, based on the buttons pushed in the pilot alone." He enjoyed the "warm dynamic" of Schiff and Highmore, while describing Thomas' character as "our emotional 'in' to Shaun's distinct, distant world". He noted that "it takes a while to build up momentum", but concluded that "the very final scene packs quite a punch, as Dr. Murphy unwittingly puts a colleague on notice".

The New York Times television critic James Poniewozik notes in his Critic's Notebook column that, for the most part, the drama is a "hospital melodrama with whiz-bang medical science, a dash of intra-staff romance and shameless sentimentality." Discussing the main characters Shaun and Dr. Aaron Glassman (Richard Schiff), Poniewozik writes that "Mr. Schiff is convincing in the role and Mr. Highmore is striking in his."

Speaking of Freddie Highmore's Golden Globe nomination on Monday, December 11, 2017, for his role in The Good Doctor, Laura Bradley, writing for Vanity Fair says: "... Freddie Highmore received the awards recognition that has long and unjustly eluded him..."  Bradley feels that Highmore's performance has been "the central key" to the show's enormous success and while the show received lukewarm reviews, most critics have praised Highmore's work.

Christy Duan, Vasilis K. Pozios and Praveen R. Kambam wrote in their critique for The Hollywood Reporter that The Good Doctor presents a belief that autistic individuals only benefit society when they possess savant abilities. This is similar to arguments made by Douwe Draaisma that directors look to make an authentic representation of autism and create a character with savant skills.

Awards and nominations

Planned spin-off
In August 2022, it was reported that a planned spin-off titled The Good Lawyer was in development at ABC. It was introduced in a backdoor pilot during the sixth season. In January 2023, it was announced that ABC had received a backdoor pilot order for the spin-off with Kennedy McMann, Felicity Huffman and Bethlehem Million set to star.

Notes

References

External links
 
 

2017 American television series debuts
2010s American workplace drama television series
2010s American medical television series
2020s American workplace drama television series
2020s American medical television series
American Broadcasting Company original programming
American television series based on South Korean television series
Autism in television
English-language television shows
San Jose, California in fiction
Television series by ABC Studios
Television series by Sony Pictures Television
Television shows filmed in Vancouver
Television shows set in Santa Clara County, California